KEYE-TV (channel 42) is a television station in Austin, Texas, United States, affiliated with CBS and Telemundo. Owned by Sinclair Broadcast Group, the station maintains studios on Metric Boulevard in North Austin and a transmitter on Waymaker Way on the city's west side.

History

Early years
The UHF channel 42 allocation in Austin had originally been used by NBC affiliate KHFI-TV when that station signed on in February 1965. That station moved to channel 36 and became KTVV in 1973; it is now KXAN-TV.

On December 4, 1983, what is known today as KEYE-TV began broadcasting originally as KBVO-TV, an independent television station. Its call sign referenced Bevo, the mascot of the hometown University of Texas Longhorns. The station's original owner was the Austin Television Company, a group of local investors including former congressman Joe Kilgore but dominated by Darrold Cannan, Jr., owner of NBC affiliate KAMR-TV in Amarillo, and Michael McKinnon, who owned two ABC affiliates in Texas (KBMT in Beaumont and KIII-TV in Corpus Christi) and independent station KUSI-TV in San Diego; local advertising executive Steve Beard was the general manager. On October 9, 1986, the station became a charter affiliate of the upstart Fox network and began branding itself as "Fox 42" on air in the early 1990s. By 1994, it was one of the top 10 highest-rated Fox affiliates in the country; Cannan and Beard were now the sole owners.

From Fox to CBS
In 1994, New World Communications purchased KTBC, which was included in a groupwide affiliation deal to switch most of New World's stations to Fox (which later purchased the New World holdings).  With KTBC set to drop its longtime CBS affiliation and land the new Fox affiliation as a result, Austin Television Company initially reached out to CBS for KBVO to land the new affiliation, but was turned down by the network at first, mainly due to concerns with affiliating with an independently owned UHF outlet. In addition, CBS outlets KENS in San Antonio and KWTX in Waco provided Grade B signals into the Austin market, should there be a concern with the region lacking a CBS affiliate. (Both stations were listed in TV listings in the Austin American-Statesman for decades.)

In October 1994, Austin Television reached a deal to sell KBVO-TV for $54 million to Granite Broadcasting Corporation, which would affiliate KBVO-TV with CBS, once the network is bumped from KTBC.

On July 1, 1995, KTBC and KBVO swapped affiliations, with Fox moving to KTBC and the CBS affiliation going to KBVO. Simultaneously with the affiliation switch, KBVO changed its callsign to KEYE-TV the same day, seeking to avoid confusion over where CBS programs were in the Austin market and bolster its ties to the new network. The callsign refers to the iconic CBS Eye logo, as well as to "The Eyes of Texas", one of several songs associated with the University of Texas. It branded itself as "K-EYE 42, Your Eye on Austin" until 1999 when the branding was shortened to simply "K-EYE" on account of the fact that it was now available to all Austin area cable subscribers on cable channel 5.

In 1999, Granite put KEYE up for sale in order to meet debt obligations; that April, CBS agreed to buy the station for $160 million. The sale closed that August, making KEYE the second owned-and-operated station of any major network in the market (after KTBC). The next year, Viacom bought CBS; at that time, KEYE became part of a cluster of television stations in Texas owned by Viacom, alongside fellow CBS station KTVT and then-UPN affiliate KTXA (now an independent station) in the Dallas–Fort Worth metroplex, and Houston UPN station KTXH. The latter station was then swapped to Fox (alongside WDCA in Washington, D.C.) in 2001 in exchange for San Francisco's KBHK.

In 2005, the station modified its branding to "CBS42 K-EYE" to reflect its CBS ownership and for cable subscribers to avoid confusion with San Antonio's CBS outlet KENS-TV, seen on VHF analog channel 5. The "K-EYE" branding was phased out altogether in 2006, with references to the KEYE-TV call sign limited to station identifications and the station's website address.

On February 7, 2007, CBS agreed to sell seven of its stations to Cerberus Capital Management, L.P., for $185 million. Cerberus formed a new holding company for the stations, Four Points Media Group, which took over the operations of the stations through local marketing agreements in late June 2007. The sale to Four Points was consummated on January 10, 2008; Four Points operated the stations outright until March 20, 2009, when it entered into a three-year local service agreement with the Irving, Texas-based Nexstar Broadcasting Group. The latter company then took over the management of all of the Four Points stations, including KEYE. In August 2009, the "CBS42" branding was dropped and the station returned to branding with its call letters; the station website address was concurrently changed to weareaustin.com.

On September 8, 2011, Sinclair Broadcast Group announced its intent to purchase Four Points from Cerberus Capital Management for $200 million; Sinclair began managing the stations, including KEYE, under local marketing agreements after receiving antitrust approval from the U.S. Department of Justice, until the sale's closure. The sale made KEYE-TV the third Sinclair-owned television property in Texas, as the group already owned Fox affiliate KABB and CW affiliate KMYS (and has since acquired NBC affiliate WOAI-TV) in San Antonio (it has also since bought Fox affiliate KFOX-TV and CBS affiliate KDBC-TV in El Paso). The deal was completed on January 3, 2012. In August 2016, the station dropped its call sign branding again and began referring to itself as "CBS Austin".

NFL preseason coverage
From 2002 to 2008, KEYE held local broadcast rights to Houston Texans pre-season games, in addition to airing CBS' coverage of NFL games from the Texans' home conference, the American Football Conference. On April 3, 2006, the station signed a deal to become the official home of the Dallas Cowboys in Austin; KEYE airs pre-season games as well as several Cowboys-related shows during the NFL season.

News operation
Before it switched to CBS, KEYE (as KBVO) had no newscasts with the exception of nightly updates aired during Fox prime time programming from a small closet studio. After the affiliation swap, on July 3, 1995, KEYE immediately launched a full slate of newscasts, under the moniker "K-EYEWitness News". Veteran anchorman Neal Spelce, formerly of KTBC, was hired as part of the new operation, and the station's Metric Boulevard studios were expanded to house the news department.

Since that time, the first newscast to be dropped was the noon newscast. The station has also added and since dropped three hours of newscasts on weekend mornings. KEYE originally used the Eyewitness News format (titled K-EYEwitness News), which was used until 2000 (the newscast title was shorted to KEYE News in late 1998, became CBS 42 K-EYE News in 2005, and then simply CBS 42 News in 2006).

KEYE-TV presently broadcasts 24½ hours of locally produced newscasts each week (with 4½ hours on weekdays and one hour each on Saturdays and Sundays); unlike most CBS stations in the Central Time Zone, KEYE does not carry a midday newscast on weekdays. In addition, the station produces five hours of newscasts each week (consisting of 5 and 10 p.m. newscasts on weeknights, which are broadcast in Spanish) for its Telemundo-affiliated digital subchannel.

KEYE became the first television station in the Austin market—and the first station in the Four Points Media Group—to begin broadcasting its local newscasts in high definition on November 1, 2007. However, while the in-studio video is in high definition, most of the field video remains in pillarboxed 4:3 standard definition.

The station canceled its 5 p.m. newscast in September 2009, replacing it with We Are Austin LIVE, an hour-long 4 p.m. lifestyle show anchored by Michelle Valles and Jason Wheeler. A few weeks later, the weekday morning newscast was canceled and later replaced with a simulcast of the J.B. and Sandy Morning Show from KAMX (94.7 FM; which was formerly owned alongside KEYE during its CBS ownership until CBS Radio sold KAMX, KKMJ, KXBT and KJCE to Entercom Communications in August 2006); this left KEYE with only the 6 and 10 p.m. newscasts and a 5:30 p.m. newscast on Sunday evenings. On June 30, 2011, the simulcast of the J.B. and Sandy Morning Show was replaced by the in-house newscast We Are Austin Mornings, a morning extension of We Are Austin LIVE that was similar in format to that of the national network morning news programs; the replacement was due in part to KEYE and Entercom-owned KAMX being unable to reach a renewal agreement for Channel 42 to continue airing the JB and Sandy Morning Show simulcast.

On May 31, 2012, KEYE-TV announced the reversal of its September 2009 late afternoon news programming changes with cancellation of We Are Austin LIVE effective June 15 (which was replaced by The Insider and Who Wants to Be a Millionaire); the 5 p.m. newscast also returned to the schedule on June 18, 2012.

In contrast to former Fox stations on UHF that are now CBS, ABC or NBC stations—which often have had little to no success against their better-established news competitors, resulting in some stations even shutting down their news departments outright—KEYE's news department has made a particularly good account of itself in the quarter-century since the switch. It has benefited from CBS pouring significant resources into the news department when the network owned the station. Austin's meteoric growth in the new millennium also benefitted the station, as new residents judge all the market's stations on their current-day merits rather than their small-market beginnings, including KEYE. It wages a spirited battle for second place in the local Nielsen ratings with KXAN, and occasionally beats out KVUE for first.

Notable former on-air staff
 Robert Flores – sports director (2000–2004; recently left ESPN; now at MLB Network)
 Shaun Robinson – 5 p.m. anchor (1995–?; recently left Access Hollywood)

Technical information

Subchannels
The station's digital signal is multiplexed:

It was announced on March 29, 2008, that KEYE would begin carrying the Retro Television Network on a new digital subchannel 42.2, running a customized schedule for the Austin market.

On October 1, 2009, digital channel 42.2 switched its affiliation to Telemundo and debuted locally produced Spanish-language newscasts at 5 and 10 p.m. weeknights, displacing RTV. It was the second Sinclair property upon their purchase associated with a Spanish-language network after West Palm Beach sister station WWHB-CA with Azteca America.

Analog-to-digital conversion
KEYE-TV shut down its analog signal in November 2008. The station's digital signal remained on its pre-transition UHF channel 43, using PSIP to display KEYE-TV's virtual channel as 42 on digital television receivers.

Due to the 2016–2017 FCC TV spectrum auction, KEYE moved from RF channel 43 to RF channel 34 on June 21, 2019.

ATSC 3.0 channels
On October 7, 2020, ATSC 3.0 (NextGen TV) began broadcasting on KBVO-CD, with KEYE-TV as a participating station. KEYE-TV's CBS subchannel was added to the ATSC 3.0 multiplex, with the station hosting two subchannels on KBVO's behalf.

References

"Dallas Cowboys align with KEYE" Austin Business Journal, April 3, 2006
"KVUE, KXAN hold on in latest ratings" Austin Business Journal, August 30, 1996
"KVUE sweeps up competition in November" Austin Business Journal, December 20, 1996

External links

 – Telemundo Austin

EYE-TV
CBS network affiliates
Telemundo network affiliates
Television channels and stations established in 1983
Sinclair Broadcast Group
1983 establishments in Texas